Jeet Jayenge Hum is an Indian television drama series airs on Sony Entertainment Television, which premiered on 14 December 2009. The series focuses on the concept of child labor, and is produced by joint venture of Aniruddh Pathak and Sanjay Kohli.

Cast
 Sana Amin Sheikh ... Suman
 Naman Shaw ... Prabhakar
 Pawan Shankar ... Manas Thakur IPS (SP City)
 Ayesha Kaduskar ... Radha
 Stuti Rushi  ... Chutki
 Namit Shah ... Shankar
 Anjali Rana ... Prabhakar's Sister 
 Akhilendra Mishra ... Yadav
 Kamya Panjabi ... Devyani
 Nawazuddin Siddiqui ... Madhav (Dead)
 Nupur Alankar ... Damyanti (Dead)
 Mehul Kajaria ... Mannu
 Shweta Ghosh ...

References

External links
Jeet Jayenge Hum Official Site on Sony TV India

Indian television series
Sony Entertainment Television original programming
Indian television soap operas
2009 Indian television series debuts
2010 Indian television series endings